Princeton University, founded in 1746 as the College of New Jersey, is a private Ivy League research university located in Princeton, New Jersey. The university is led by a president, who is selected by the board of trustees by ballot.  The president is an ex officio member of the board and presides at its meetings. One of five officers of the university's legal corporation, the Trustees of Princeton University, the president also acts as the chief executive officer. The president is tasked with "general supervision of the interests of the University" and represents the institution in public. If the office is vacant, the board can either appoint an acting president, or the university's provost can serve in such capacity. The office was established in Princeton's original charter of 1746.

The institution's first president was Jonathan Dickinson in 1747, and its 20th and current is Christopher Eisgruber, who was elected in 2013. All of Princeton's presidents have been male besides Shirley Tilghman; all have been white. James Carnahan had the longest serving tenure at 31 years, and Jonathan Edwards had the shortest at five weeks. There have been six acting presidents, and eleven presidents who have been alumni of the university. Princeton presidents have a long association with the Presbyterian church, with every president before Woodrow Wilson in 1902 being a Presbyterian clergyman. The first nine presidents were slaveholders, with five holding slaves while living in the president's house. Thirteen of Princeton's seventeen deceased presidents are buried in President Lot of Princeton Cemetery. , the salary of the president was $944,952. 

The president's official residence has changed several times over the lifespan of the university. Built in 1756, the John Maclean House, also known as the President's House, was where the president lived until Prospect House was acquired in 1878. In 1968, the official residence switched again to Walter Lowrie House. The Office of the President is housed in Nassau Hall.

Presidents

See also 

 List of Princeton University people
 History of Princeton University

Notes

References

Citations

Works cited

External links
 Official website

 
Lists of university and college leaders
Presidents
Princeton University faculty